Moroccan passports are issued to nationals and citizens of Morocco for the purpose of international travel. Besides serving as a proof of Moroccan citizenship, they facilitate the process of securing assistance from Moroccan consular officials abroad if needed. Since 15 December 2009, a biometric passport was available for all new applicants.
Moroccan citizens can now apply for a passport anytime, anywhere. Launched in tandem with the new enrollment program, a web portal outlining issuance requirements takes applicants through the procedure step by step, from the comfort of their keyboard. Once proof of identity has been gathered, the applicant can fill in an online form to print and submit in person at the prefecture.

Appearance

Cover design 
The Moroccan passport has the following wording on its cover :

Top: "المملكة المغربية"
"ROYAUME DU MAROC"
"KINGDOM OF MOROCCO"

Middle: The Coat of Arms of Morocco

Bottom: "جواز سفر "
"PASSEPORT"
"PASSPORT"

There are several colors for different types of passports:

 Ordinary passports are green
 Diplomatic passports are burgundy red
 Special passports are blue
 Service passports are brown

Identity page 
The identity page of an ordinary passport contains the following data :

 Photograph of the bearer
 Type of passport (P)
 Country code (MAR)
 Passport number
 Family name of the bearer
 Given name(s) of the bearer
 Nationality ("Marocaine مغربية", Moroccan)
 Sex
 Date of birth
 Place of birth
 Address
 Date of issuance
 Authority issuing the passport
 National ID number
 Date of expiry
 Scanned signature of the bearer
 Machine Readable Zone

Visa requirements

In 2021, Moroccan citizens had visa-free or visa on arrival access to 70countries and territories, ranking the Moroccan passport 67th in terms of travel freedom according to the Henley Passport Index.

References

Passeport.ma

See also
 Visa requirements for Moroccan citizens
 Visa policy of Morocco
 SansVisa.ma : Moroccan travelers portal of countries without a VISA requirement

Passports by country
Government of Morocco